Two Tenors is an album credited to jazz musicians John Coltrane and Hank Mobley, released in 1969 on Prestige Records, catalogue 7670. It is a reissue of Prestige 7043 Informal Jazz by Elmo Hope, released in 1956. As Coltrane's fame grew during the 1960s long after he had stopped recording for the label, Prestige assembled varied recordings, often those where Coltrane had been merely a sideman, and reissued them as a new album with Coltrane's name prominently displayed. In this case, by 1969 Hope had become a far less marketable figure than Coltrane and Mobley, hence the redesignation of the LP.

Track listing
 "Weeja" (Elmo Hope) — 11:00
 "Polka Dots and Moonbeams" (Jimmy Van Heusen, Johnny Burke) — 8:31
 "On It" (Elmo Hope) — 8:58
 "Avalon" (Al Jolson, Buddy DeSylva, Vincent Rose) — 9:37

Personnel
 Elmo Hope — piano  
 Donald Byrd — trumpet
 John Coltrane, Hank Mobley — tenor saxophone 
 Paul Chambers — bass  
 Philly Joe Jones — drums

References

External links
 Allmusic entry

1969 albums
Hard bop albums
John Coltrane albums
Prestige Records albums
Hank Mobley albums
Albums produced by Bob Weinstock